The Philippine Football Federation (PFF) is the governing body of association football in the Philippines. Established as the Philippine Amateur Football Association (PAFA) in 1907, the PFF is one of the oldest national football associations in Asia and is among the founding members of the Asian Football Confederation (AFC). The PAFA reorganized as the Philippine Football Association (PFA), and later as the Philippine Football Federation.

Aside from being a member of the AFC, the PFF is also a member of the ASEAN Football Federation. It is recognized as the national sports association (NSA) for the sport of football in the Philippines by Philippine Olympic Committee.

It organizes the Philippines men's, women's and youth national football teams (as well as national teams for the football variants of futsal and beach soccer). It is also responsible for the organization of domestic football tournaments in the Philippines such as Philippines Football League and the Copa Paulino Alcantara through the Liga Futbol Inc., and the PFF Women's League.

History

Early history
The football body's origins dates back to 1907 when it was established as the Philippine Amateur Football Association (PAFA). It was among the twelve founding Asian football associations of the Asian Football Confederation.

In 1917, the first Spanish and Filipino footballer to play for a European club, Paulino Alcántara Riestra, was selected by the Philippines to represent the country at the Far Eastern Championship Games in Tokyo. He helped them defeat Japan 15–2, which remains the largest win in Philippine international football history.

In 1961, stakeholders of Philippine football officially organized themselves to establish the Philippine Football Association (PFA) which was later reorganized as the Philippine Football Federation in 1982.

Adad era
In October 1996, Rene Adad was installed as PFF president after a snap election which ousted his predecessor, Ricardo Tan. In 2002, the PFF inaugurated its first regional center in Barotac Nuevo, Iloilo.

Martinez era
The PFF under the Presidency of Jose Mari Martinez saw crises which challenged his leadership as well as the national teams.

Under Martinez, the PFF also had a new headquarters, the PFF House of Football in Pasig, which was inaugurated by then FIFA President Sepp Blatter and AFC President bin Hammam in 2008. The PFF moved to the building after occupying the PhilSports Complex as its headquarters for decades.

In 2009, a crisis affected the Philippine women's national futsal which resulted to the ouster of women's futsal coach Emmanuel Batungbacal and long-time men's national football coach Juan Cutillas. Batungbacal was sacked allegedly leading the futsal team in a tournament without sanction from the PFF. Batungbacal said that he had sanction and he claimed Martinez ignored to make a dialogue with him on the matter. The players who played under Batungbacal resigned from international duty as protests. Martinez said that a lack of suitable coaching license was the reason to Batungbacal's dismissal.

On 27 November 2010 at the PFF 7th Ordinary Congress at the PhilSports Complex in Pasig, Martinez was ousted by 25 Presidents out of the 29 present member associations to approve a resolution made by 8 members of the Board of Governors calling for the ousting and replacement of Martinez as PFF president. Martinez was dismissed due to allegedly falsifying public documents and misusing funds. Mariano Araneta was named Interim President.

Araneta era
After serving as Interim President for about a year after Martinez's ouster in 2010, Araneta was elected as president on 26 November 2011 at a PFF congress held at the Astoria Plaza in Pasig.

On 14 October 2016 at the Edsa Shangri-La Hotel in Pasig, the Online PFF Player Registration System was launched following a contract signing between the PFF, MMC Sportz Marketing and RSportz. The initiative by the PFF is among the first in Southeast Asia. The registration system will create a database of Filipino players which will be accessible to organizers of PFF-sanctioned tournaments. The registration system was planned to be online by November 2016.

In November 2016, Araneta announced that the PFF will move its headquarters to Carmona, Cavite in 2017 where an artificial football pitch is due to be finished within the month. The new location will also house a dormitory, a natural grass pitch and corporate offices.

The PFF's registration system dubbed "My PFF" was officially launched in June 2017 and will be embedded in PFF's website on 3 July 2017 to be more accessible for registrants.

A financial issue with the Philippine Sports Commission (PSC) was resolved on September 14, 2018, when the PFF remitted  amount of unliquidated financial assistance from the government agency. The scope of the financial aid covers the administrations of the PFF from past 1996 to 2010.

The PFF was given the right to hold AFC ‘A’ and AFC ‘B’ Diploma Courses in the Philippines by the Asian Football Confederation starting 2019. The federation launched its first esports tournament, the PFF eTrophy which featured the video game title FIFA 21 in 2021.

In July 30, 2022, the groundbreaking ceremony for the new PPF headquarters in Carmona took place. In November 2022, the PFF decided to allow the expansion of its regional associations.

Presidents

Association staff

Member associations
There are 36 member associations, three of which are professional football clubs, under the PFF.

 Agusan del Sur – Surigao del Sur RFA
 Cordillera RFA
 Bukidnon FA
 Butuan – Agusan Del Norte FA
 RFA of Camarines Norte
 Camiguin-Misamis Oriental FA
 Central Visayas RFA
 Golden Davao RFA
 North Davao RFA
 Davao R.F.A.
 Iligan – Lanao Regional Football Association (Iligan-Lanao RFA)
 Iloilo FA
 Laguna – Cavite RFA
 Legazpi City – Albay Federated RFA
 East Visayas R.F.A.
 Federated F.A. of Masbate
 Central Bicol RFA
 National Capital Region F.A.
 Negros Occidental F.A.
 Negros Oriental – Siquijor RFA
 Maguindanao-Cotabato City FA
 Misamis Occidental – Ozamis FA
 Mount Apo RFA
 Oriental Mindoro FA
 Quezon – Batangas RFA
 FA of Rizal
 South Cotabato – Sarangani – Gen. Santos City RFA (SOCSARGEN RFA)
 Sultan Kudarat RFA
 Surigao del Norte and Dinagat Islands RFA
 Central Luzon RFA
 Zamboanga del Norte – Dipolog RFA
 Pagadian – Zamboanga del Sur – Sibugay RFA
 Zamboanga – Basilan – Sulu – Tawi-tawi FA (ZAMBASULTA FA)
 Kaya FC-Iloilo
 Stallion Laguna FC
 United City FC

PFF competitions

National league
 Philippines Football League
 PFF Women's League

National Cups
 Copa Paulino Alcantara
 PFF National Men's Club Championship (defunct) 
 PFF Women's Cup

Youth competitions
 PFF National Men's U-23 Championship (defunct) 
 PFF National U-22 Amateur Championship (inactive)
 PFF U-19 Boys National Football Championship

Esports
PFF eTrophy

Current title holders

Current national team head coaches

Honours
The PFF was given the AFC President Recognition Award for Grassroots Football in the Developing Category in 2014 and in 2016.

See also
 Philippines national football team
 Philippine women's national football team
 List of football clubs in the Philippines
 Philippine football clubs in Asian competitions

References

External links
 Philippines at FIFA site
 Philippines at AFC site
 AFF webpage
 Statutes of the Philippine Football Federation (in force since December 30, 2013)

 
1907 establishments in the Philippines
Philippines
Football
Sports organizations established in 1907